Callizzia is a genus of scoopwing moths of the family Uraniidae. The genus was described by Packard in 1876. The adults' hindwings are sharply creased, forming a scoop shape.  There are two species in the genus.  The gray scoopwing moth (Callizzia amorata) is the type species of the genus, and the type specimen was collected in Albany, New York, in the United States.

Species
 Callizzia amorata Packard, 1876 – gray scoopwing moth
 Callizzia certiorara Pearsall, 1906

References

Uraniidae